Belated life - a.k.a. Late life is a psychological drama and melodrama film by Ayub Shahobiddinov, filmed in 2010. The film was presented to many international film festivals; in 2012 this film received two awards "The best male actor" and special award of "Бронзовый витязь" at once at "Золотой витязь" (Golden Knight) film festival held in Omsk, Russia. Apart from this, the film was screened at fifth forum of traditionally organized "Friendship" film festival in India and received positive reviews from critics.

Storyline 
One of the heroines of the film, Shahodat lives in a city. She works as an editor at one of the well-known publishing companies. She doen't have any materialistic problems, but has sufficient problems in personal life. She is 30 and not married yet. She understands that she should change her life, quits her immediate life-style and gets married to a man named Hamlet, a butcher in the village. Marriage... and conflicts are ahead for them...

Actors and characters 

 Dilnoza Kubayeva - Shahodat
 Bobur Yuldashev - Hamlet
 Doniyot Hafizov - Erkin
 Karim Mirkhodiyev - uncle of Erkin
 Zulkhumor Muminova - aunt of Erkin
 Rikhsikhon Ibrokhimova - mother of Hamlet
 Pulat Saidqosimov - chairman of mahalla
 Jamila Gafurova -

Awards

References 

2010 films